Albor is a surname. Notable people with the surname include:

 Alejandro Albor (born 1964), American cyclist
 Xerardo Fernández Albor (1917–2018), Spanish physician and politician

See also
 Albor Tholus, a Martian volcano
 Albot